Dhaka Assembly constituency is an assembly constituency in the Indian state of Bihar, in Purvi Champaran district.

Overview 
As per orders of Delimitation of Parliamentary and Assembly constituencies Order, 2008, 21. Dhaka Assembly constituency is composed of the following: Dhaka and Ghorasahan community development blocks.

Dhaka Assembly constituency is part of 4. Sheohar (Lok Sabha constituency).

Members of Legislative Assembly

Election results

2020 Vidhan Sabha Elections

2015
 Faisal Rahman of RJD, won the Dhaka assembly seat defeating his nearest rival Pawan Jaiswal of BJP.

2010
 Pawan Kumar Jaiswal (Ind), defeated Faisal Rahman of JD-U

1972
 Hafiz Idris Ansari (INC) : 18,619 votes  
 Nek Mahamad Akhtar (IND) : 15,688

References

External links
 

Assembly constituencies of Bihar
Politics of East Champaran district